Satara nympha is a moth in the family Erebidae. It was described by Vladimir Viktorovitch Dubatolov and Yasunori Kishida in 2005. It is found in central Sulawesi.

References

Moths described in 2005
Spilosomina